Scioli is a surname. Notable people with the surname include:

Brad Scioli (born 1976), American football player
Daniel Scioli (born 1957), Argentine politician, sportsman and businessman
 John Scioli
Tom Scioli (born  1977), American comic book artist and writer